SKR Engineering College is a postsecondary educational institution located in Chennai, Tamil Nadu, India focusing on engineering.

Undergraduate courses (4 years) 
Bachelor of Engineering degree in
Bio-Medical Engineering
Computer Science & Engineering
Information Technology
Electronics and Communication Engineering
Electrical & Electronics Engineering
Mechanical Engineering
Computer science & Business Systems

Postgraduate courses (2 years) 
Master of Business Administration
SKR Engineering College is an engineering college in Poonamallee, Chennai, Tamil Nadu, India. The institution was established in 2001 by Shri A.M.Srinivasan and Shri K. Ramadoss.
The College is approved by the All India Council for Technical Education (AICTE), New Delhi and is affiliated to Anna University, Chennai. SKR Engineering College formed under the aegis of Srinivasa Educational Trust, is a living testimony of a magnanimous management, spearheaded by Sri. K. Ramadoss, the Chairman, and ably supported by the other members of the trust. True to their dictum of crafting rational and intellectual engineers, the institution envisages a silent knowledge revolution in terms of engineering education.

The College runs with the sole aim of imparting quality technical education to the students and to develop them into eminent Engineers, both in theory and practice. In addition to teaching Engineering and Technology, SKR strives to instill in each student the virtues and skills needed to make a difference in the world of tomorrow.

SKR Engineering College, has earned its strong academic reputation in the field of engineering education. Since its founding in 2001, the college has upheld a rigorous commitment towards engineering education in scope and depth. With a modest beginning in 2001 of offering three programs in a single block, the college has grown brick by brick with 6 UG and 3 PG programs in 6 blocks. Today, in its 15th year of brilliant and dedicated contribution to the field of higher education, it stands tall as a citadel of learning, waiting to scale even greater heights. , SKR Engineering College is approved by the All India Council for Technical Education (AICTE), New Delhi and is affiliated to Anna University, Chennai. The institution is ISO 9001:2008 certified and runs NBA accredited programmes CSE, ECE, EEE, Mech and IT. The exclusivity of this institution is that it nurtures creativity and innovations to the maximum extent. The institution is located on the Chennai-Bangalore National Highway (NH-45) and spread across 23 acres of land, assures the aspiring engineers recognition for their individuality and originality. Students prepare themselves through experimental learning opportunities, an extensive career network and countless co-curricular activities.

Highlights of Institution 
Prizes for academic excellence
Mentors for Counseling
Information Resource Center (LIBRARY)
Career Assistance
Enrichment courses
Business incubation center
The salient features of our prestigious Institution are, Spoken and Written English training is being offered for all 4 years to suite for employability.
Special Care is being offered for Maths and Mathematical oriented subjects for all 4 years by splitting the classes into 30 instead of 60 for effective delivery and individual attention. For the benefits of the Tamil medium students of rural background to score good marks in examinations are provided with lecture notes and Q&A banks.
Students are offered not only academic knowledge but also provided with practical exposure by having tie-up with top MNCs by MOUs, periodical Industrial Visits and Internship training etc., which enable the students to be placed in MNCs like TCS,CTS, Infosys, Tech Mahindra, L&T Infotech, MRF etc.
Several Value Added Courses are conducted in the Campus such as IBM, CISCO, RedHat,.NET, Lab VIEW, Solid Modeling ,PLC SCADA & Rapid Photo Typing facility is also available. Our institution is a member of several Professional Societies namely IEEE, ISTE, IETE, IET, CSI, IE(I) & SAE.
SKR Engineering College is part of mission mode PICO Satellite program of ISRO, Bangaluru through which 26 PG Students of all branches have got practical exposure during this project at Bangaluru. The college received with a financial grant of 63 lakhs from MSME, government of India for nurturing the entrepreneur initiatives among the students.
Scholarships in the form of full or partial waiver of tuition fee is awarded to top TNEA rankers, meritorious, sports and socio-economically weaker students.
Campus wide 24/7 WI FI Facility

References

External links 
Website

Educational institutions established in 2001
Engineering colleges in Chennai
Engineering colleges in Tamil Nadu
2001 establishments in Tamil Nadu
Colleges affiliated to Anna University